"Chalk Dust – The Umpire Strikes Back" is a 1982 novelty song credited to The Brat and performed by British comedians Kaplan Kaye and Roger Kitter. The song satirises tennis champion John McEnroe who was notorious for his temper tantrums. It reached number 19 in the UK Singles Chart in July 1982. Its B-side was a track named "Moody Mole" and the cover art was by illustrator Graham Humphreys.

The song
"Chalk Dust – The Umpire Strikes Back" is a satire of American tennis player John McEnroe and lampoons his infamous angry behaviour on the tennis court to a synthesizer beat. The entire song is a conversation between McEnroe (played by Roger Kitter) and the referee (played by Kaplan Kaye). They bicker and bicker until the referee finally loses his patience and just shoots McEnroe dead. The line "The ball's in, everyone can see that the ball's in!" was an actual quotation from McEnroe. As McEnroe dies in the song his final words are: "I was talking to myself!", which also a genuine excuse the real-life McEnroe used whenever a referee scolded him for being insulted.  The title is a pun on the film The Empire Strikes Back (1980) and the tennis term umpire. Released on the Hansa label, the single entered the UK Singles Chart on 10 July 1982. It reached a peak of number 19, and remained in the chart for 8 weeks. The song was also a Top 10 hit in the Netherlands and Belgium and a Top 20 hit in South Africa and Ireland.

Charts

Weekly charts

Year-end charts

Sources

1982 songs
1982 singles
Comedy songs
Satirical songs
Novelty songs
Tennis music
Cultural depictions of tennis players
Cultural depictions of John McEnroe
Hansa Records singles